Anurag Sharma may refer to:

 Anurag Sharma (actor)
 Anurag Sharma (physicist)
 Anurag Sharma (politician)